Helcystogramma conturbata is a moth in the family Gelechiidae. It was described by Edward Meyrick in 1933. It is found in Sierra Leone.

References

Moths described in 1933
conturbata
Moths of Africa